The women's shot put event at the 2019 European Athletics U23 Championships will be held in Gävle, Sweden, at Gavlehov Stadium Park on 12 and 13 July.

Medalists

Results

Qualification
Qualification rule: 16.00 (Q) or the 12 best results (q) qualified for the final.

Final

References

Shot
Shot put at the European Athletics U23 Championships